Knellpoort Dam is a combined gravity & arch type dam located on the Riet Spruit, near Wepener, Free State, South Africa. It was established in 1989.
Due to siltation, the storage capacity of the Welbedacht Dam reduced rapidly from the original 115 million m3 to approximately 16 million m3 during the twenty years since completion. This reduction in storage created problems in meeting the Bloemfontein water demand at an acceptable level of reliability and as a result, the 50 m high Knellpoort Dam was completed in 1989. It was the first arch gravity roller compacted concrete (RCC) dam in the world and comprises almost 64 600 m3 rollcrete and 14 200 m3 concrete with a gross storage capacity of 136 million m3.

Water from the Caledon River is pumped to Knellpoort Dam from the Tienfontein Pumping Station via a 2 km long canal which is equipped with a silt trap to reduce siltation in the main reservoir.

The dams primary purpose is to serve for municipal and industrial use and its hazard potential has been ranked high (3).

See also
Welbedacht Dam
List of reservoirs and dams in South Africa
List of rivers of South Africa

References 

 List of South African Dams from the Department of Water Affairs and Forestry (South Africa)

Dams in South Africa
Dams completed in 1988